Fallin' is an extended play (EP) by American rapper StaySolidRocky. It was released on July 17, 2020, by Columbia Records. The EP features production by Nashi, Chriz Beatz, Drumma Boy, SephGotTheWaves, Glaazer, KFK, Chris Productions, and Niko. The mixtape includes features from Lil Uzi Vert and Big4Keezy.

Artwork 
The cover art features a cartoon of StaySolidRocky falling into a black hole, while the track listing depicts him nearly fully submerged in the black hole.

Singles 
On September 30, 2019, the EP's first single and third track "Party Girl" was released via SoundCloud. On April 21, 2020, the track was released via Apple Music and Spotify.

On December 11, 2019, the EP's second single and sixth track "Toxic" was released via SoundCloud. On April 6, 2020, the track was released via Apple Music and Spotify.

On March 4, 2020, the EP's third single and seventh track "Soft Aggression" was released via Apple Music and Spotify. On March 5, 2020, the track was released via SoundCloud.

On June 19, 2020, the EP's fourth single and fifth track "Vacant Heart" was released via Apple Music, SoundCloud, and Spotify.

On July 10, 2020, the EP's fifth single and third track "Party Girl (Remix) was released via Apple Music, SoundCloud, and Spotify.

Release and promotion 
On July 10, 2020, the visualizer for the EP's first track "Party Girl (Remix)" was released. As of August 2020, the visualizer has accumulated nearly 3 million views.

On December 24, 2019, the music video for the EP's third track "Party Girl" was released. As of August 2020, the music video has accumulated over 70 million views.

On July 16, 2020, the music video for the EP's fifth track "Vacant Heart" was released. As of August 2020, the music video has accumulated over 300 thousand views.

On June 15, 2020, the music video for the EP's sixth track "Toxic" was released. As of August 2020, the music video has accumulated nearly 900 thousand views.

Track listing 
Credits were adapted from Tidal.

Personnel 
Credits were adapted from Tidal.

Performers

 StaySolidRocky – primary artist
 Lil Uzi Vert – featured artist 
 Big4Keezy – featured artist 

Technical

 THEDONRRRM – mastering engineer , mixing engineer 
 StaySolidRocky – recording engineer 
 Joe Grasso – mixing engineer 

Production

 Nashi – producer 
 Chriz Beats – producer 
 Drumma Boy – producer 
 Glaazer – producer 
 SephGotTheWaves – producer 
 Kfk – producer 
 Chris Productions – producer 
 Niko  – producer

Charts

References 

Columbia Records EPs
2020 debut EPs